A two-part referendum was held in Republika Srpska on 15 and 16 May 1993. Voters were asked whether they approved of the Vance-Owen Peace Plan, and whether Republika Srpska should be able to join another country.

Although President Radovan Karadžić had signed the Vance-Owen Peace Plan on 30 April, it was rejected by the National Assembly on 6 May, and subsequently referred to a referendum. It was subsequently rejected by 97% of voters, whilst the proposal to allow the territory to join other countries was approved by a similar percentage.

Mediators referred to the referendum as a "sham".

Results

References

Republika Srpksa
1993 in Bosnia and Herzegovina
Referendums in Bosnia and Herzegovina
Referendums in Republika Srpska
Bosnian War
Political history of Republika Srpska
Serbian nationalism in Bosnia and Herzegovina